A mill race is the current of water that turns a water wheel, or the channel (sluice) conducting water to or from a water wheel.

Mill race may also refer to:
Mill Race (log flume), a log flume formerly at Cedar Point amusement park
Mill Race Park, a city park in Columbus, Indiana